Eremaea ectadioclada is a plant in the myrtle family, Myrtaceae and is endemic to the south-west of Western Australia. It is a low, spreading shrub with small leaves, and orange-coloured flowers on the ends of the long branches which grew in the previous year.

Description
Its younger branches are densely covered with fine hairs. There is a single vein, sometimes three veins visible on the lower surface.

The flowers are orange-coloured and occur singly or (rarely) in pairs, on the ends of the longer branches which grew in the previous year. The stamens, which give the flower its colour, are arranged in 5 bundles, each containing 16 to 36 stamens. Flowering occurs from July to November and is followed by fruits which are woody capsules. This species can be distinguished from other eremaeas by its rough, usually star-shaped fruit and narrow leaves.

Taxonomy and naming
Eremaea ectadioclada was first formally described in 1993 by Roger Hnatiuk in Nuytsia. The specific epithet (ectadioclada) is from the Ancient Greek ektadios meaning "spreading" and klados meaning "branch" in reference to the growth form of this species.

Distribution and habitat
Eremaea ectadioclada is found in near-coastal areas of the Irwin district between Eneabba and Jurien Bay in the Geraldton Sandplains  biogeographic region. It grows in sandy soil over laterite on sandplains.

Conservation
Eremaea ectadioclada is classified as "not threatened" by the Western Australian Government Department of Parks and Wildlife.

References

ectadioclada
Myrtales of Australia
Plants described in 1993
Endemic flora of Western Australia